Sakapultek may refer to
 Sakapultek people, an ethnic subgroup of the Maya
 Sakapultek language, the language spoken by that people